Mansoor Hosseini (born 1967) is an Iranian-Swedish percussionist and composer of classical music, born in Iran, who studied in Paris and Brussels. His works comprise chamber music and orchestral pieces. He founded the Ensemble Themus in Gothenburg, focussed on theatrical music.

Career 

Hosseini studied composition with Philippe Capdenat and Yoshihisa Taïra in Paris. He studied music theory and computer music with Peter Swinnen at the Royal Conservatory of Brussels and composition with Carl-Axel Hall in the Musikhögskolan (sv) of Gothenborg. He studied with George Aperghis who encouraged him to compose theatrical music in the style of Mauricio Kagel.

In 2003, Hosseini founded the Gothenburg Music & Dance Company (GMDC), which in 2007 transformed into the Ensemble Themus in Gothenburg with a mission to popularize the concept of theatrical music by allowing actors and musicians to swap and intermingle their roles. His work in the field is inspired by modern dance, theatre and martial arts.

Hosseini has a great interest in improvisation both as a composer and performer. He sometimes adds sections to his compositions which are marked to let the musicians know that they can improvise in a controlled and measured way. He has been a lecturer in musical notation, composition, communication between musicians and composers, and the comprehension of musical notation for musicians.

He was awarded prizes, including the culture prizes of Gothenborg and of the Västra Götaland.

Works 

Hosseini's duo Bones (second piece) for piano and cello was composed in 1998, described as a race of the two instruments, with "buddhistic cluster sounds" in the piano and "roaring three-notes" in the cello that
"float and combine like dream sequence". His string quartet Esfand II was premiered at the Sibelius Museum (fi) in Turku in 2011, when the town was a European Capital of Culture.

His composition Bright Blue Bird, In A Grey Red Sky for violin and orchestra was premiered on 22 June 2014 at the Allerheiligen-Hofkirche in Munich by the Nymphenburger Kammerorchester with Henja Semmler as the violinist and Manuel Nawri conducting. The work is based on a Persian legend about the mythical bird Simurgh. A thousand birds travel to find his feather (and enlightenment), but after a hard journey only 30 of them reach the destination, which turns out to be a lake reflecting their image.

List of selected works 

Orchestra

 2015 Waves Above, recorder concerto
 2014 Bright Blue Bird, In A Grey Red Sky for violin and orchestra
 2014 Non Se Que Que Quen Za Za for string orchestra
 1999 Into the Earth, oboe concerto

Chamber music

 2015 Trance Dance Ritual for oboe and ensemble
 2013 Psychological Song for mezzo-soprano and cello
 2013 Three Words for mezzo-soprano and guitar
 2013 Taïraphone for saxophone and percussion
 2013 Cold, Dry Wind for piano
 2012 Zapp Music for guitar
 2012 Mountain Top for three woodwind instruments and piano
 2012 Rubaiyatfor mezzo-soprano and piano
 2011 3 tangos for string quartet
 2011 Mr & Mrs Saxophone for tenor saxophone
 2011 Heavy Metal Bars for violin
 2011 Labyrinth of Moods for recorder, mezzo-sopran and percussion
 2010 Coffee Time for three percussionists
 2008 Four For Four for four cellos
 2008 Working Timefor three percussionists
 2007 Le Sonnet for organ
 2006 Sonata for a Prisoner for violin
 2006 Swedish Raga for bass clarinet, cello and drums
 2006 Barock ’n’ Roll for eight instruments
 2002 Taïraga for 13 instruments
 2001 Esfand I for string quartet, didgeridoo and percussion
 2000 Bones (fourth piece) for viola, piano, mezzo-soprano and synthesizer
 1999 Âvâz for flute, bass clarinet and trumpet
 1998 Bones (second piece) for cello and piano

References

External links 

Themus Ensemble members

Swedish composers
Swedish male composers
Living people
1967 births
Iranian emigrants to Sweden